The 1989 Motorcraft Formula Ford Driver to Europe Series was an Australian motor racing competition open to Formula Ford racing cars. It was the 20th Australian Formula Ford Series.

The series was won by Mark Larkham driving a Van Diemen RF89.

Calendar

The series was contested over seven rounds with one race per round.

Points system
Points were awarded on a 20-15-12-10-8-6-4-3-2-1 basis for the first ten places at each round.

Series standings

 1989 Australian Formula Ford regulations mandated the use of a 1600cc Ford cross flow engine.
 Half points were awarded for the Lakeside round due to the race distance being reduced as a result of scheduling issues.

Notes and references

Motorcraft Formula Ford Driver to Europe Series
Australian Formula Ford Series